The Others is an American television series created by John Brancato and Michael Ferris, and produced by Delusional Films, NBC Studios, and DreamWorks Television. It ran for thirteen 40-minute episodes from February 5, 2000, to June 10, 2000, airing on NBC. It concerned a group of people with various psychic talents as they encountered different, and often evil, paranormal forces.  It was an ensemble series. It featured in the third attempt by NBC to air a Saturday night supernatural/paranormal programming block, joining The Pretender and Profiler as the Thrillogy, but all three shows were canceled by season's end.

Premise
Marian Kitt, a university student, is forced to come to terms with her frequently unwanted paranormal abilities, attempting to do so by joining The Others, a group with similar talents. The series gradually built up an overall storyline of a strong evil power targeting the group.

Cast
 Julianne Nicholson as Marian Kitt
 Gabriel Macht as Mark Gabriel
 Missy Crider (credited as 'Melissa Crider') as Ellen "Satori" Pawlowski
 Bill Cobbs as Elmer Greentree
 John Billingsley as Professor Miles Ballard
 Kevin J. O'Connor as Warren Day
 John Aylward as Albert McGonagle

Episodes
Note that the episodes were not always broadcast by NBC in the correct story order. For the correct story order for the episodes, refer to the order from the production codes.

Production
The series' writers included Glen Morgan and James Wong, who were also executive producers for the series along with Brancato and Ferris. Morgan's wife Kristen Cloke played the significant role of Allison/The Woman in the episodes "The Ones That Lie in Wait" and "Life Is for the Living". Tobe Hooper directed one episode, "Souls on Board", and Bill Condon directed the episode "1112".

The series was filmed at Paramount Studios. The pilot episode was filmed in Vancouver, British Columbia, Canada.

Broadcast
The series aired on Five in the UK, and on Nine in Australia.

Reception
Michael Speier of Variety was lukewarm on the first episode of the series, noting that "the roles here are one-note: no humor and no sparks, just a lot of paranoia", but adding "Bill Condon ("Gods and Monsters) and Tobe Hooper ("Poltergeist") have already wrapped upcoming episodes, and it’s hoped their styles will generate bigger oohs and aahs than the Mick Garris-helmed pilot." Howard Rosenberg of Los Angeles Times was more openly critical of the series, declaring "There’s nothing especially thoughtful or suspenseful here, for example, and Episodes 1 and 2, after raising expectations of creepiness, both end with soft thuds." By contrast, Bruce Fretts of Entertainment Weekly gave the series a favorable review, commenting that The Others "has a bewitching cast that mixes appealing up-and-comers (including Melissa Crider...) with reliable old-timers (like the always-wonderful Bill Cobbs...)", adding that the series was "compellingly creepy".

References

External links
 
 
 

2000s American science fiction television series
NBC original programming
2000 American television series debuts
2000 American television series endings
Television shows set in Boston
Television series by Universal Television
Television series by DreamWorks Television
Television shows filmed in Vancouver